Gamma Ophiuchi, Latinized from γ Ophiuchi, is a fourth-magnitude star in the constellation Ophiuchus. Together with Beta Ophiuchi, it forms the serpent-holder's right shoulder. The staris visible to the naked eye with an apparent visual magnitude of +3.75. It is moving closer to the Sun with a radial velocity of −7.6 km/s.

It is known also as Muliphen, although at least two more stars are known with this name: Gamma Canis Majoris (often spelled as Muliphein) and Gamma Centauri (often spelled as Muhlifain).

This is an A-type main sequence star with a stellar classification of A0 V. Gray et al. (2003) lists a classification of A1VnkA0mA0, indicating it is of type A1 V with the calcium K-line and metallic lines of an A0 star. It is approximately 184 million years old and is spinning rapidly with a projected rotational velocity of 220 km/s. Gamma Ophiuchi has nearly three times the mass of the Sun and 1.8 times the Sun's radius. It is radiating an excess emission of infrared, suggesting the presence of a circumstellar disk of dust at an orbital radius of 64 AU from the host star.

References 

A-type main-sequence stars
Ophiuchi, Gamma
Ophiuchus (constellation)
Durchmusterung objects
Ophiuchi, 62
161868
087108
6771